Cleander was a tyrant who ruled the Sicilian city of Gela, which had been previously subject to an oligarchy.  He founded the Pantarid dynasty, reigning for seven years, and was murdered in 498 BC by a citizen of Gela named Sabyllus who wanted to see the introduction of democracy in the city.  Instead power was transferred to Cleander’s brother, Hippocrates of Gela.

It has been suggested that Cleander was responsible for building Gela's first city wall due to a problematic relationship with the native Sicels, a situation thought to have been caused by Cleander himself.

Notes

References

|width=25% align=center|Preceded by:—
|width=25% align=center|Tyrant of Gela505 BC – 498 BC
|width=25% align=center|Succeeded by:Hippocrates

498 BC deaths
Sicilian tyrants
Ancient Geloans
5th-century BC Greek people
Year of birth unknown